The 1980 Houston Oilers season was the franchise's 21st overall and the 11th in the National Football League (NFL). The team scored 295 points while the defense gave up 251 points. Their record of 11 wins and 5 losses resulted in a second-place finish in the AFC Central Division. The Oilers appeared twice on Monday Night Football. In their first appearance on Monday Night Football, the Oilers beat the Cleveland Browns 16–7. In their second appearance, the Oilers defeated the New England Patriots 38–34. Earl Campbell led the NFL in rushing for the third consecutive year and had four 200-yard rushing games.

This was the third season in a row that the Oilers made the playoffs. The team lost in the AFC Wild Card Round to the eventual Super Bowl champions, the Oakland Raiders. The Oilers would not make it back to the playoffs again until 1987.

The last remaining active member of the 1980 Houston Oilers was defensive lineman Mike Stensrud, who retired after the 1989 season.

Offseason

NFL draft

Personnel

Staff

Roster

Regular season

Earl Campbell
 In 1980, Earl Campbell had four 200-yard rushing games.

Schedule

Standings

Postseason

AFC Wild Card

Even though the Oilers recorded more yards, more first downs, and more time of possession, the Raiders scored on big plays to win, 27–7.
This would be Ken Stabler's final playoff game.

Awards and records
 Earl Campbell, NFL Rushing Leader, (1,934)
 Earl Campbell, All-Pro selection 1980
 Earl Campbell, Pro Bowl selection 1980 
 Earl Campbell, NEA NFL MVP (1980)
 Earl Campbell, NFL Offensive Player of the Year (1980)

Milestones
 Earl Campbell, 3rd 1,000-yard rushing season
 Earl Campbell, 3rd NFL Rushing Title
 Earl Campbell, Four 200-yard rushing games (Oct 19, Oct 26, Nov., 16, Dec. 21)

References

External links
 1980 Houston Oilers at Pro-Football-Reference.com

Houston Oilers
Houston Oilers seasons
Houston